The 2004–05 Iran Pro League was the 22nd season of Iran's Football League and fourth as Iran Pro League since its establishment in 2001. PAS Tehran were the defending champions. The season featured 14 teams from the 2003–04 Iran Pro League and two new teams promoted from the 2003–04 Azadegan League: Saba Battery as champions and Malavan as runner-up. The league started on 13 September 2004 and ended on 20 June 2005. Foolad won the Pro League title for the first time in their history (total first Iranian title).

Final classification

Results table

Player statistics

Top goal scorers

20
  Reza Enayati (Esteghlal)
14
  Fereydoon Fazli (Aboomoslem)
  Rasoul Khatibi (Sepahan)
12
  Eman Mobali (Foolad)
11
  Ali Daei (Saba Battery)
9
  Arash Borhani (Pas Tehran)
  Javad Kazemian (Persepolis)
  Javad Nekounam (PAS Tehran)
  Iman Razaghirad (Pas Tehran)
8
  Sohrab Entezari (Persepolis)
  Mehrdad Oladi (Persepolis)
  Mehdi Rajabzadeh (Zob Ahan)
  Hojat Zadmahmoud (Est. Ahvaz)

Participating in international competitions
2005 AFC Champions League
PAS
Sepahan

References

Iran Premier League Statistics
Persian League

Iran Pro League seasons
Iran
1